Anteosaurs are a group of large, primitive carnivorous dinocephalian therapsids with large canines and incisors and short limbs, that are known from the Middle Permian of South Africa, Russia, China, and Brazil. They died out at the end of the Middle Permian, possibly as a result of the extinction of the herbivorous Tapinocephalia on which they may have fed.

Description

The Anteosauria are distinguished from the Tapinocephalia by a number of features, such as very large canines, cheek teeth with bulbous crowns, and an upturning of the premaxilla, so that the front of mouth curves strongly upwards. There is a tendency especially in more advanced forms such as Anteosaurus towards thickening of the bones of the top of the skull, indicating head-butting behaviour. There is a large canal for the pineal organ (third eye); probably tied in with the animal's diurnal and seasonal cycles.

The shoulder girdle is fairly light, with a narrow interclavicle, clavicle, and scapular blade. The femur (thigh bone) is slender and curved. These were, in spite of their size, probably quite agile animals. The limbs are short and the skull long, narrow, and heavy. The tail is very long in at least some genera.

Evolutionary relationships
The early Russian (Boonstra 1972) and Chinese (Rubidge & Sidor 2001) anteosaurs are generally considered the most primitive of the dinocephalians, although it has also been suggested (Kemp, 1982, King 1988) that the estemmenosuchids are more basal. They have featured in common with pelycosaurs (Carroll 1988) and Biarmosuchians (Chudinov 1965), and, with the Tapinocehalia, are part of the first major evolutionary radiation of the Therapsida (Rubidge & Sidor 2001). So far, little work has been done on detailed phylogenetic relationships between the various taxa.

Palaeobiology

Ecology

The stance of a typical anteosaur, such as Titanophoneus, was primitive. Rather than the limbs being drawn in under the body, the stance was more sprawling. Olson (1962) notes that the Russian dinocephalian assemblages indicate environments tied to water, and Boonstra considered that the roughly contemporary Anteosaurus was a slinking crocodile-like semi-aquatic form. The long tail, weak limbs, and sprawling posture do indeed suggest some sort of crocodile-like existence. However, the thickened skull-roof indicates that these animals were quite able to get about on land, if they were to practice the typically dinocephalian head-butting behavior. All other head-butters; pachycephalosaurian dinosaurs, titanothere ungulates, and goats were or are completely terrestrial. Perhaps these animals spent some time in the water but were active on land during the mating season, and probably quite able to get about on land to hunt for prey.

Feeding
Anteosaurs were evolved to prey on particularly large animals and were among the most highly predaceous of all synapsids (Sennikov, 1996), potential prey included the bull-sized armored pareiasaurs (Lee, 1997) and
enormous tapinocephalid dinocephalians (Rubidge, 1995).

The large anteosaurs were efficient predators, more specialized than earlier and more primitive biarmosuchid and eotitanosuchid carnivorous therapsids, as the temporal opening behind the eye socket was larger, indicating a greater muscle mass available for closing the lower jaw. Large pterygoid flanges indicate a well-developed KI system in anteosaurs, and increased vertical alignment of the temporalis muscles suggests an expanded SP component of the bite cycle.

Classification

Phylogeny

James Hopson and Herbert Barghusen in 1986 provided the first cladistic study of the Therapsida. They used the term "Anteosauria" and synonymised the families Brithopodidae and Anteosauridae. In 2010, Christian Kammerer published a re-evaluation of anteosaurian relationships.

The cladogram below follows an updated (2012) version of Kammerer's analysis by Juan Carolos Cisneros and colleagues.

Taxonomy
The group was originally defined as a superfamily by L. D. Boonstra in 1962 to include the families
Brithopodidae and Anteosauridae.

Superfamily Anteosauroidea Boonstra, 1962
Family Brithopidae Efremov, 1954
family Anteosauridae Boonstra, 1954

Gillian King in a 1988 review of the Anomodontia (including the Dinocephalia - however the view that the Dinocephalia are a subset of the Anomodontia is no longer held) as part of Gutsav Fischer Verlag's ongoing Encyclopedia of Paleoherpetology series of volumes, uses a more traditional Linnaean arrangement, but includes the herbivorous forms under the superfamily Anteosauroidea as well. The "Titanosuchidae" here is equivalent to the "Tapinocephalia".

Superfamily Anteosauroidea Boonstra, 1962
Family Brithopidae Boonstra, 1972
Subfamily Brithopodinae Efremov, 1954
Subfamily Anteosaurinae Boonstra, 1954
Family Titanosuchidae Boonstra, 1972
Subfamily Titanosuchinae Broom, 1903
Subfamily Tapinocephalinae Lydekker, 1890

After Kammerer et al., 2011.

 CLASS Synapsida
 Order Therapsida
 Suborder Dinocephalia
 Clade Anteosauria
 Family Anteosauridae
 Archaeosyodon
 Microsyodon
 Subfamily Anteosaurinae
 Sinophoneus
 Titanophoneus
 Anteosaurus
 Subfamily Syodontinae 
 Australosyodon
 Notosyodon
 Pampaphoneus
 Syodon
 Family Brithopodidae
 Admetophoneus
 Brithopus
 Chthomaloporus
 Eosyodon
 Mnemeiosaurus
 Family Deuterosauridae
 Deuterosaurus

References

Further reading
 Boonstra, L.D., 1972, Discard the names Theriodontia and Anomodontia: a new classification of the Therapsida. Annals of the South African Museum 59:315-338.
 Carroll, R. L., 1988, Vertebrate Paleontology and Evolution, WH Freeman & Co.
 Chudinov, P. K. 1965, "New Facts about the Fauna of the Upper Permian of the USSR", Journal of Geology, 73:117-30
 Hopson, J.A. and Barghusen, H.R., 1986, An analysis of therapsid relationships in N Hotton III, PD MacLean, JJ Roth and EC Roth, The Ecology and Biology of Mammal-like Reptiles, Smithsonian Institution Press, pp. 83–106
 King, G.M., 1988, "Anomodontia" Part 17 C, Encyclopedia of Paleoherpetology, Gutsav Fischer Verlag, Stuttgart and New York,
 Rubidge, B.S. & Sidor, C.A. 2001, Evolutionary patterns among Permo-Triassic therapsids. Annu. Rev. Ecol. Syst. 32: 449-480.

External links
 Palaeos - detailed description
 Mikko's Phylogeny Archive - list of genera in the form of a cladogram

 
Guadalupian first appearances
Guadalupian extinctions